Petch may refer to:

 Henry Petch, partner of Perkins, Bacon & Petch
 Howard Petch (born 1925), Canadian academic administrator
 Ivan Petch (born 1939), former Australian politician
 Karen Petch, English broadcaster and news presenter
 Mark Petch, founder of Mark Petch Motorsport
 N. J. Petch, co-discoverer of the Hall-Petch relationship
 Tom Petch (1870–1948), English mycologist
 Rattana Petch-Aporn (born 1982), Thai footballer